Juan Revi Auriqto (born 4 June 1986) is an Indonesian former footballer who played as a defensive midfielder. He is of Chinese descent.

Honours

Club
Arema
 Indonesia Super League: 2009–10
 East Java Governor Cup: 2013
 Indonesian Inter Island Cup: 2014/15
Persik Kediri
Liga 2: 2019

References

External links
 
 

1986 births
Living people
Indonesian footballers
Indonesian people of Chinese descent
Indonesian sportspeople of Chinese descent
Sportspeople from Surabaya
Deltras F.C. players
Arema F.C. players
PSS Sleman players
Liga 1 (Indonesia) players
Indonesian Premier Division players
Association football midfielders